Potts Preserve is an  property protected by the Southwest Florida Water Management District in Inverness, Florida (Citrus County). Wetlands in the preserve "play a role in both the Tsala Apopka Chain of Lakes and the Withlacoochee River systems." Biking, birdwatching, camping, horseback riding, boating, fishing, hiking and hunting, are offered in the park.

References

Parks in Citrus County, Florida
Southwest Florida Water Management District reserves